The 1963 Miami Hurricanes football team represented the University of Miami as an independent during the 1963 NCAA University Division football season. Led by 16th-year head coach Andy Gustafson, the Hurricanes played their home games at the Miami Orange Bowl in Miami, Florida. They finished the season 3–7.

Schedule

Personnel

References

Miami
Miami Hurricanes football seasons
Miami Hurricanes football